The following is a list of the international call prefixes of various countries that need to be dialled when placing an international telephone call. These prefixes are required when dialling from a landline. When calling from a GSM-compliant mobile phone (cell phone), only the symbol + before the country code may be used irrespective of where the telephone is used at that moment; the network operator provides the access codes automatically.

Countries by international prefix

Countries using optional carrier selection code 
The following is a non-exhaustive list of countries that optionally allow for carrier selection in addition to using the standard prefix listed in the preceding section.

Historic international prefixes
The following are international call prefixes that were used in various countries sometime in the past but are no longer used.

See also 
 List of country calling codes (International telephone dialing codes)
 List of mobile telephone prefixes by country
 List of North American Numbering Plan area codes
 Public switched telephone network

Notes

References

External links 
 Standards and recommendations
 
 
 

Call Prefixes
Telephone numbers
Telecommunications lists